Immortal Combat is the second album from Hostyle Gospel. Hostyle Gospel Ministries released the project on January 11, 2011. Hostyle Gospel Ministries worked with Samuel Shaw and Jarrett Johnson on the production of this album.

Reception

Specifying in a six-star review (out of 10) by Cross Rhythms, Steve Hayes responds, "The album moves across hip-hop territory through Midwest, east, west, old skool and beyond." Jono Davies, indicating in a four star review from Louder Than The Music, realizing, "If you're looking for an album that is dynamic, with interesting lyrics and pounding beats that would fit on any mainstream hip hop album, Immortal Combat might be an album worth trying." Neil Christian, writes in a 4.7 out of 10 stars review from Holy Culture, replying, "what Hostyle Gospel has done, is create an album cover that personifies the album’s theme. You already know what the message is without hearing a single bar of the album. The image of four guys, dressed in khakis, hoisting the cross with heavy exertion on their faces, immediately coveys the idea that we are in a war. We are in a war against the world and the secular music industry that is promoting sin heavily. We are in a war against sin and against our flesh."

Track listing

Music Videos 

 "Coming Back Again"  featuring Jarrett Johnson from Chapter 6 (band)

Personnel

Performance 

 Hostyle Gospel - primary artists

Featured artists 

 Jarrett Johnson from Chapter 6 (band)

Production and engineering 

 Fontaine Pizza - engineer, producer
 Raynard Glass - engineer, producer
 Demetrius Morton - producer
 King Son - producer
 Samuel Shaw - producer

Wardrobe 

 Leslie Leyhe - wardrobe
 Tim Leyhe    - wardrobe

Packaging 

 Yolanda Glass - photography
 Omari Thomas  - graphic Design

References

External links
 Cross Rhythms.

2011 albums
Hostyle Gospel albums